Ralph McKittrick (August 17, 1877 – May 4, 1923) was an American golfer and tennis player who competed in the 1904 Summer Olympics.

In 1904 McKittrick was part of the American team which won the silver medal in the team golf event. He finished eleventh in this competition.  In the individual competition he finished first in the qualification but was eliminated in the second round of the match play.

McKittrick also competed in the single tennis competition but was eliminated in the second round.  With his partner Dwight F. Davis he also participated in the tennis doubles tournament, where they were eliminated in the quarter-finals.

He graduated from Harvard University.

References

External links
 Profile

American male golfers
American male tennis players
Golfers at the 1904 Summer Olympics
Tennis players at the 1904 Summer Olympics
Olympic tennis players of the United States
Olympic silver medalists for the United States in golf
Medalists at the 1904 Summer Olympics
Harvard Crimson men's tennis players
Place of birth missing
1877 births
1923 deaths